Mihailo Jovanović (Serbian Cyrillic: Михаило Јовановић; born 29 November 1975) is a Serbian football player.

He was released by his former club South China in Hong Kong First Division League after 2006-07 season. He started playing in Hong Kong with Kitchee in 2004 after one year he transferred to Rangers in 2006. He was originally on short-term trial in South China, but after it able to gain a longer contract last until the end of 2006-07 season.

Career Statistics in Hong Kong
As of 19 May 2007

External links
 Player Information on scaafc.com 
 Mihailo Jovanović at HKFA

References

1975 births
Living people
Footballers from Belgrade
Serbian footballers
South China AA players
Hong Kong Rangers FC players
Kitchee SC players
Hong Kong First Division League players
Expatriate footballers in Hong Kong
Serbian expatriate sportspeople in Hong Kong
Association football midfielders